Poggiridenti is a comune (municipality) in the Province of Sondrio in the Italian region Lombardy, located about  northeast of Milan and about  east of Sondrio.

Poggiridenti borders the following municipalities: Montagna in Valtellina, Piateda, Tresivio.

The church of San Fedele has frescoes by Fermo Stella.

Demographic evolution

References

External links
 www.comune.poggiridenti.so.it

Cities and towns in Lombardy